Timothy Taylor is a modern and contemporary art gallery in Mayfair, London, owned and founded by the art dealer Timothy Taylor. The gallery represents artists and sells original and editioned artworks across different media.

History
Timothy Taylor was founded in 1996 on Bruton Place in London and later moved to 24 Dering Street in 2003, expanding to include a second space at 21 Dering Street from 2006 to 2007.

The gallery opened a  space inside a former bank building at 15 Carlos Place, Mayfair, in October 2007, with an inaugural exhibition of Alex Katz's One Flight Up., The move allowed the gallery to exhibit a greater scope of works in a space designed by Eric Parry Architects. In 2019, it relocated to a five-story townhouse with a  exhibition space, again designed by Parry.

The gallery first opened at 515 West 19th Street in New York’s Chelsea district in 2016. By 2022, it decided to relocate to a  space in Tribeca on the ground floor of 74 Leonard Street, designed by the New York-based architectural firm studioMDA.

The gallery has produced over twenty publications, and shown over seventy exhibitions since its opening. Timothy Taylor also takes part in art fairs, including Frieze Art Fair, Art Basel Miami, and Art Basel.

The art dealer Timothy Taylor is its owner and director.

Artists
Timothy Taylor Gallery represents numerous living artists, including:
 Shezad Dawood (since 2015)
 Gabriel de la Mora (since 2015)
 Alex Katz
 Josephine Meckseper
 Kiki Smith

In addition, the gallery manages various artist estates, including: 
 Antoni Tàpies

In the past, the gallery has worked with the following artists and estates: 
 Simon Hantaï
 Hilary Pecis

References

External links

1996 establishments in England
Buildings and structures in the City of Westminster
Contemporary art galleries in London